Maria Badstue (born 1982) is a Danish orchestral conductor. She came to attention after winning the special prize at the prestigious Lovro von Matacic Competition 2011. Following the award she made a very successful debut with the Copenhagen Phil in Tivoli Hall May 2013, and she has worked with major orchestras in Scandinavia including the Gothenburg Symphony, Helsingborg Symphony, Kristiansand Symphony  Odense Symphony Orchestra, the South Denmark Philharmonic, the Aalborg Symphony Orchestra and Storstroem Symphony Orchestra. In 2012 she made her opera conducting debut in the premiere of ANGELO by Lars Klit in Copenhagen. Summer of 2014 saw her as co-conductor of the highly acclaimed youth orchestra Orkester Norden, where she conducted the majority of the rehearsals for Thomas Søndergaard and led her own concert with the orchestra at the Vendsyssel Festival.

With a great interest in contemporary music she has premiered several pieces, and she has also appeared with the Cikada Ensemble in Oslo. With Slesvigske musikkorps she conducted the opening concert of the Rued Langgaard Festival 2014 in a programme with music by Strauss and Langgaard.
 
Maria Badstue started conducting  at the age of 17 and conducted her first professional concert at the age of 20. Since 2007 she has studied privately with Jorma Panula, and in 2011 she enrolled at the master's degree programme for conductors at the Norwegian State Academy of Music with Jukka-Pekka Saraste and Ole Kristian Ruud as her main professors. 
 
She was trained as a trumpet player. She received her master's degree from the Carl Nielsen Academy of Music and has played with the Odense Symphony Orchestra. In 2012 she was awarded the Arne Hammebo Education Scholarship from Danish Conductors Association.
 
During season 2012-2013 she has developed a close relationship to the South Jutland Symphony Orchestra having conducted the opening concert and numerous school and presentation concerts.
She is the initiator and founder of the annual "Nordic Masterclass for Conductors" organized in cooperation with the orchestra.

References

External links 
 Maria Badstue's homepage
 Official Nordic Artists Management biography

Danish conductors (music)
Women conductors (music)
1982 births
Living people
21st-century conductors (music)
21st-century women musicians
21st-century Danish musicians